BC Kyiv was a Ukrainian professional basketball club based in Kyiv. The club's home court for Ukrainian domestic league matches was the Meridian Sports Complex, which has a seating capacity of 1,500. Large attendance games and European-wide competition games were held at the 7,000 seat Kyiv Sports Palace.

History
The club was founded in 1999. Kyiv won the Ukrainian SuperLeague in 2000 and 2005, and also reached the FIBA EuroCup final in 2005. Over this time, the club has also developed a huge rivalry with their city opponents Budivelnyk Kyiv.

Season by season

Trophies
 Ukrainian SuperLeague (2):
 Champions (2): 2000, 2005
 Runners-up (6): 2001, 2002, 2004, 2006, 2007, 2008
 Third-place (1): 2003

Ukrainian Cup (1):
 Champions (1): 2007
 Runners-up (3): 2006, 2008, 2010

 FIBA EuroCup (0):
 Runners-up (1): 2005
 Third place (1): 2006

Notable players

 Afik Nissim
  Grigorij Khizhnyak
  Alexander Lokhmanchuk
  Oleksiy Pecherov
  Sasha Volkov (Player, and one of the founders of the club.)
  Marcelo Nicola
  Ratko Varda
  Manuchar Markoishvili
  Ioannis Giannoulis
  Rimas Kurtinaitis
  Goran Nikolić
  Ruan Stik
  Dušan Kecman
  Dragan Lukovski
  Gary Ervin
  Mike Harris
  Scoonie Penn

References

External links
 Official Site

Kyiv
Sport in Kyiv
Basketball teams established in 1999
Basketball teams disestablished in 2015
1999 establishments in Ukraine
2015 disestablishments in Ukraine